Michael Ejeba (born February 25, 1993), popularly known as Efe or Efe Money, is a Nigerian singer, media personality, songwriter, and rapper. He is the winner of Big Brother Naija season 2.

Early life and career
Michael Efe Ejeba born February 25, 1993, is a native of Delta State But was born and brought up in Jos, Plateau State. He attained his primary and secondary school education in Jos. He is a graduate of university of Jos, Pleateau.

In 2017, he was appointed as an Ambassador of entertainment and creative industry role in plateau and Youth Ambassador by the Nigeria Ministry of Youth and sport. In 2018 he became  African Ambassador for Indian Varsity.

Discography

Mixtapes
 Best Of Efe (The Playlist) (2020)

EPs
 Karam (2009)
 Dusty Road (2015)
 Am Sorry Am Winning (2018)
 NONSTOP (2020)
 Quemalo (2021)
 I miss you deaa (2021)
 Recuerdos (2021)

Albums
 Ve Bagi (2004)
 Efelerin Efesi (2011)
 For the World (2014)
 Efe Sings for You (2014)
 Dusty Road (2015)

Singles
 "Campaign" (2019)

Filmography

Television

References

External links 
 Efe on Instagram
 

Living people
21st-century Nigerian male singers
1995 births
Big Brother (franchise) winners
Participants in Nigerian reality television series
Nigerian rappers
English-language singers from Nigeria